Young Euro Classic is an international music festival for youth orchestras. Established in Berlin, Germany in 2000, it is one of the world's most important international platforms for young musicians in the Western classical music tradition. Every summer, orchestras from all over the world perform at the Konzerthaus Berlin.

The festival is an associated member organization of the European Federation of National Youth Orchestras.

History

2021 
Young Euro Classic 2021 was held from July 30 to August 15. 
  Young Euro Classic Orchestra Germany–France (in cooperation with the Bundesjugendorchester and the Orchestre Français des Jeunes)
  Bundesjugendballett
  Greek Youth Symphony Orchestra
 Ensemble Mini (replacing the Portuguese Youth Orchestra)
 c/o chamber orchestra (replacing the Spanish National Youth Orchestra)
  Wiener Jeunesse Orchester
  Bundesjugendorchester
  National Youth Orchestra of Romania
  O/Modernt New Generation Orchestra
  German-French Junior Academy
 Schleswig-Holstein Festival Orchestra
 LGT Young Soloists
  Russian German Music Academy (replacing the Chelyabinsk Symphony Orchestra)
 Moritzburg Festival Orchestra
  Orquesta del Lyceum de La Habana

2020 
Due to the COVID-19 pandemic, Young Euro Classic 2020 was held from August 1 to August 10 in a reduced chamber music format. Concerts were broadcast online.

2019 

Young Euro Classic 2019 was held from July 19 to August 6. It was the most high-profile festival to-date, with the national youth orchestras of China, the United Kingdom, Germany, the European Union, and the United States performing.
  Polish Sinfonia Iuventus Orchestra
  International Tatarstan Youth Orchestra
  National Youth Symphony Orchestra of the Dominican Republic
  Romanian Youth Orchestra
  O/Modernt Chamber Orchestra
  Turkish National Youth Philharmonic Orchestra
  Portuguese Youth Orchestra
  Slovak Youth Orchestra
  National Youth Symphony Orchestra of Chile
  Bundesjugendballett
  Galilee Chamber Orchestra
  National Youth Orchestra of Great Britain
  European Union Youth Orchestra
  Bundesjugendorchester
  National Youth Orchestra of China
  National Youth Orchestra of the United States of America

2018 
Young Euro Classic 2018 was held from August 2 to August 20.
  Boston Philharmonic Youth Orchestra
  MIAGI Youth Orchestra
  Bundesjugendorchester
  Spanish National Youth Orchestra
  Bundesjugendballett
  Ljubljana Academy of Music Symphony Orchestra
  National Youth Orchestra of Canada
  Romanian Youth Orchestra
  NYO Jazz
  National Youth Orchestra of the Netherlands
  Youth Chamber Orchestra St. Petersburg
  Ungdomssymfonikerne
  European Union Youth Orchestra
 Southbank Sinfonia
  Youth Symphony Orchestra of Ukraine
  Georgian Sinfonietta
  Auckland Youth Orchestra
 Schleswig-Holstein Musik Festival Orchestra

2017 
Young Euro Classic 2017 was held from August 17 to September 3.
  Colombian Youth Philharmonic
 Schleswig-Holstein Musik Festival Orchestra
  Bundesjugendballett
  Bundesjugendorchester
  O/Modernt Chamber Orchestra
  International Tchaikovsky Youth Orchestra Yekaterinburg
  Baltic Sea Philharmonic
  Elisabeth University of Music Choir and Orchestra
  Moldovan National Youth Orchestra
  Turkish National Youth Philharmonic Orchestra
 Asian Youth Orchestra
  Gustav Mahler Jugendorchester
  Portuguese Youth Orchestra
  Orchestre Français des Jeunes
  Cuban-European Youth Orchestra

2016 
Young Euro Classic 2016 was held from August 17 to September 3.
  European Union Youth Orchestra
  Bundesjugendballett
  Ungdomssymfonikerne
  Jāzeps Vītols Latvian Academy of Music Orchestra
 Schleswig-Holstein Musik Festival Orchestra
  Bundesjugendorchester
  Kazakh National Academy of Arts Orchestra
  National Youth Orchestra of the Netherlands
  Romania-Moldova Youth Orchestra
  Bulgarian National Youth Orchestra "Pioneer"
  Gustav Mahler Jugendorchester
  Urals Mussorgsky State Conservatoire Orchestra
 Arab Youth Philharmonic Orchestra
  Estonian Academy of Music and Theatre Orchestra
  Deutsche Streicherphilharmonie
  Orquesta Sinfónica "Estanislao Mejía"
  Orchestre Français des Jeunes

2015 
Young Euro Classic 2015 was held from August 6 to August 23.
  Young Philharmonic Orchestra Jerusalem Weimar
  Bundesjugendballett
  O/Modernt Chamber Orchestra
  Bundesjugendorchester
  National Youth Orchestra of Great Britain
  Portuguese Youth Orchestra
  Ungdomssymfonikerne
  Kyiv Conservatory Symphony Orchestra
  Guangzhou Symphony Youth Orchestra
  Turkish National Youth Philharmonic Orchestra
  National Youth Orchestra of the Netherlands
 I, Culture Orchestra
  New Georgian Philharmonic
 Young Euro Classic Peace Orchestra

2014 
Young Euro Classic 2014 was held from June 22 to June 29 and from August 8 to August 17.
  Orchestre Français des Jeunes
  All-Russian Youth Orchestra
  Romanian Youth Orchestra
  Orchestra of the Central Conservatory of Music
  MIAGI Youth Orchestra
  Spanish National Youth Orchestra
  Bundesjugendorchester
  Junge Deutsche Philharmonie
  NJO Sinfonietta and Dutch National Opera Academy
 Schleswig-Holstein Musik Festival Orchestra

Awards 
In 2008, Gabriele Minz, director of Young Euro Classic, was awarded the Order of Merit of Berlin.

In 2015, Young Euro Classic secured the title European Culture Brand of 2015.

In 2016, the Israeli Embassy in Berlin awarded Young Euro Classic with a medal for services to bilateral relations.

References

Music in Berlin
Classical music festivals in Germany